Liutpert (or Liutbert) (died 702) was the Lombard king of Italy from 700 and to 702, with interruption. Upon succeeding his father, King Cunincpert, at a young age, he ruled together with his tutor, Ansprand, the duke of Asti. After eight months, he was deposed by Raginpert, the duke of Turin and son of Godepert, Liutpert's great-uncle, but succeeded in returning to the throne several months later upon Raginpert's death, only to be deposed again, taken captive from Pavia, and drowned by Aripert II, Raginpert's son.
He was buried in the Basilica of Santissimo Salvatore in Pavia.

Notes 

7th-century births
702 deaths
8th-century Lombard monarchs
Monarchs deposed as children
Medieval child monarchs
8th-century murdered monarchs
7th-century Lombard people
Bavarian dynasty
Year of birth unknown
People executed by drowning